Trina Robbins (born Trina Perlson; August 17, 1938, in Brooklyn, New York) is an American cartoonist. She was an early participant in the underground comix movement, and one of the first female artists in that movement. In the 1980s, Robbins became the first woman to draw Wonder Woman comics. She is a member of the Will Eisner Hall of Fame.

Career

Early work 
Robbins was an active member of science fiction fandom in the 1950s and 1960s. Her illustrations appeared in science fiction fanzines like the Hugo-nominated Habakkuk.

Comics 
Robbins' first comics were printed in the East Village Other; she also contributed to the spin-off underground comic Gothic Blimp Works.

In 1969, Robbins designed the costume for the Warren Publishing character Vampirella for artist Frank Frazetta in Vampirella #1 (Sept. 1969).

She left New York for San Francisco in 1970, where she worked at the feminist underground newspaper It Ain't Me, Babe. The same year, she and fellow female artist Barbara "Willy" Mendes co-produced the first all-woman comic book, the one-shot It Ain't Me, Babe Comix.  Robbins became involved in creating outlets for and promoting female comics artists, through projects such as the comics anthology Wimmen's Comix, with which she was involved for twenty years. Wimmen's Comix #1 featured Robbins' "Sandy Comes Out", the first-ever comic strip featuring an "out" lesbian.

During this time, Robbins also became a contributor to the San Francisco-based underground paper Good Times, along with art director Harry Driggs and Guy Colwell.

Robbins became increasingly outspoken in her beliefs, criticizing underground comix artist Robert Crumb for the perceived misogyny of many of his comics, saying, "It's weird to me how willing people are to overlook the hideous darkness in Crumb's work ... What the hell is funny about rape and murder?"

In the early 1980s, Robbins created adaptations of Sax Rohmer's Dope and Tanith Lee's The Silver Metal Lover. In the mid-1980s she wrote and drew Misty for the Marvel Comics children's imprint Star Comics. The short-lived series was a reinterpretation of the long-standing character Millie the Model, now an adult running her own modeling agency and minding her niece Misty.

She followed Misty with California Girls, an eight-issue series published by Eclipse Comics in 1987–1988.

In 1990, Robbins edited and contributed to Choices: A Pro-Choice Benefit Comic Anthology for the National Organization for Women, published under Robbins' own imprint, Angry Isis Press. The all-star list of contributors, who were mostly but not all women, included representatives of the underground — Lee Marrs, Sharon Rudahl, Harry Driggs, Diane Noomin, Harry S. Robins, and Robbins herself; alternative — Nina Paley, Phoebe Gloeckner, Reed Waller & Kate Worley, Roberta Gregory, Norman Dog, and Steve Lafler; queer — Leslie Ewing, Jennifer Camper, Alison Bechdel, Angela Bocage, Jackie Urbanovic, Howard Cruse, Robert Triptow, and M. J. Goldberg; and mainstream — Cynthia Martin, Barbara Slate, Mindy Newell, Ramona Fradon, Steve Leialoha, William Messner-Loebs, and Bill Koeb — comics communities. A number of contributors — Nicole Hollander, Cathy Guisewite, Garry Trudeau, Bill Griffith, and Jules Feiffer — were comic strip creators whose work in the anthology was reprinted from their syndicated strips.

In 2000 Robbins introduced GoGirl! — superhero stories designed to appeal to young girls. Robbins wrote the stories, with Anne Timmons providing the bulk of the art. The series ran for five issues with Image Comics, and then was picked up by Dark Horse Comics, with the final issue coming out in 2006. 

In 2010, she began writing comics adventures of the Honey West female detective character for a series published by Moonstone Books.

Wonder Woman 
Robbins' official involvement with Wonder Woman began in 1986. At the conclusion of the first volume of the series (in conjunction with the series Crisis on Infinite Earths), DC Comics published a four-issue limited series titled The Legend of Wonder Woman, written by Kurt Busiek and drawn by Robbins. Robbins was the first woman to draw Wonder Woman comics. The series paid homage to the character's Golden Age roots. She also appeared as herself in Wonder Woman Annual 2 (1989). 

In the mid-1990s, Robbins criticized artist Mike Deodato's "bad girl art" portrayal of Wonder Woman, calling Deodato's version of the character a "barely clothed hypersexual pinup." 

In the late 1990s, Robbins collaborated with Colleen Doran on the DC Comics graphic novel Wonder Woman: The Once and Future Story, on the subject of spousal abuse.

Writing and activism 
In addition to her comics work, Robbins is an author of nonfiction books on the history of women in cartooning.

Her first book, co-written with Catherine Yronwode, was Women and the Comics, a history of female comic-strip and comic-book creators. Subsequent Robbins volumes on women in the comics industry include A Century of Women Cartoonists (Kitchen Sink, 1993), The Great Women Superheroes (Kitchen Sink, 1997), From Girls to Grrrlz: A History of Women’s Comics from Teens to Zines (Chronicle, 1999), and The Great Women Cartoonists (Watson-Guptill, 2001). More recent work includes Pretty In Ink, published by Fantagraphics in 2013, which covers the history of North American women in comics from Rose O'Neill's 1896 strip The Old Subscriber Calls to the present.

Robbins was a co-founder of Friends of Lulu, a nonprofit formed in 1994 to promote readership of comic books by women and the participation of women in the comic book industry.

Robbins is featured in the feminist history film She's Beautiful When She's Angry.

Personal life 

Robbins was intimately involved in the 1960s rock scene, where she was close friends with Jim Morrison and The Byrds. She is the first of the three "Ladies of the Canyon" in Joni Mitchell's classic song from the album of the same name. In the late 1960s she ran an East Village clothing boutique called "Broccoli" and made clothes for Mama Cass, Donovan, David Crosby and others. She wrote a memoir entitled Last Girl Standing, released in 2017 from Fantagraphics. Her partner is artist Steve Leialoha.

Awards and recognition

Robbins was a Special Guest of the 1977 San Diego Comic-Con, when she was presented with an Inkpot Award. She won a Special Achievement Award from the San Diego Comic Con in 1989 for her work on Strip AIDS U.S.A., a benefit book that she co-edited with Bill Sienkiewicz and Robert Triptow.

She was the 1992 Guest of Honor of WisCon, the Wisconsin Science Fiction Convention.

In 2002, Robbins was given the Special John Buscema Haxtur Award, a recognition for comics published in Spain.

In 2011, Robbins' artwork was exhibited as part of the Koffler Gallery show Graphic Details: Confessional Comics by Jewish Women.

In July 2013, during the San Diego Comic-Con, Robbins was one of six inductees into the Will Eisner Hall of Fame. The award was presented by Mad magazine cartoonist and Groo the Wanderer creator Sergio Aragonés. The other inductees were Lee Falk, Al Jaffee, Mort Meskin, Joe Sinnott, and Spain Rodriguez.

In a 2015 poll, Robbins was ranked #25 among the best female comics creators of all-time.

In 2017, Robbins was chosen for the Wizard World Hall of Legends.

Comics Alliance listed Robbins as one of twelve women cartoonists deserving of lifetime achievement recognition.

Robbins' art and art from her collection of the work of women cartoonists was featured in the 2020 Society of Illustrators exhibit "Women in Comics: Looking Forward, Looking Back". It was later featured in the "Women in Comics" exhibit at the Palazzo Merulana in Rome, Italy.

Bibliography

Comics 
 As writer/artist, unless otherwise noted

Major works 
 It Ain't Me, Babe Comix (Last Gasp, 1970) — co-founder, contributor
 All Girl Thrills (Print Mint, 1971) — editor, contributor
 Wimmen's Comix (Last Gasp, Renegade Press, Rip Off Press, 1972–1992) — co-founder, contributor
 Mama! Dramas (Educomics, June 1978) — editor and contributor, along with Suzy Varty, Joyce Farmer, and others
 Dope (Eclipse Comics, 1981–1983) — adaptation of the Sax Rohmer novel
 The Silver Metal Lover (Crown Books, 1985) — adaptation of the Tanith Lee novel
 Misty (Star Comics, 1985–1986) — limited series
 The Legend of Wonder Woman (DC Comics, 1986) — limited series
 California Girls #1–8 (Eclipse Comics, 1987–1988) — writer/artist, with contributions from Barb Rausch
 Strip AIDS U.S.A.: A Collection of Cartoon Art to Benefit People With AIDS (Last Gasp, 1988) — co-editor with Bill Sienkiewicz and Robert Triptow
 Choices: A Pro-Choice Benefit Comic Anthology for the National Organization for Women (Angry Isis Press, 1990) — editor and contributor
 Wonder Woman: The Once and Future Story (DC Comics, 1998) — writer; drawn by Colleen Doran
 GoGirl! #1–5 (Image Comics, 2000–2001) — writer
 GoGirl! #1–3 (Dark Horse Comics, 2002–2006) — writer; issues #2–3 feature all new material
 Honey West #1, 2, 6, 7 (Moonstone Books, 2010) — writer 
Honey West and The Cat #1–2 (Moonstone Books, 2013) — writer

Anthology contributions 
 East Village Other (late 1960s) 
 Gothic Blimp Works (East Village Other, 1969) 
 Moonchild Comix #3 (Nicola Cuti; Moonchild Productions, September 1970) 
 Swift Comics (Bantam Books, 1971) 
 Girl Fight Comics #1–2 (Print Mint, 1972, 1974)
 Tuff Shit Comics (Print Mint, 1972) 
 Barbarian Comics #4 (California Comics, 1972) 
 Comix Book (Marvel Comics, Kitchen Sink Press, 1974–1976) 
 Tits & Clits Comix #3 (Nanny Goat Productions, 1977) 
 Gates of Eden (FantaCo Enterprises, 1982) 
 Good Girls (Wonderful Publishing Company, 1985) 
 Gay Comix #6, #11, #25 (Bob Ross, 1985, 1986, 1998)
 War News (Jim Mitchell, 1991) — underground newspaper launched to protest the first Gulf War.
 Alien Apocalypse 2006 (Frog Ltd., 2000) 
 9-11: September 11, 2001 (Artists Respond) (Dark Horse Comics/Chaos! Comics/Image Comics, 2002)
 The Phantom Chronicles (Moonstone Books, 2007)
 Girl Comics (Marvel Comics, 2010)

Nonfiction
 Women and the Comics by Catherine Yronwode and Trina Robbins (Eclipse, 1983) 
 A Century of Women Cartoonists (Kitchen Sink, 1993) 
 The Great Women Superheroes (Kitchen Sink, 1997) 
 From Girls to Grrrlz: A History of Women’s Comics from Teens to Zines (Chronicle, 1999) 
 The Great Women Cartoonists (Watson-Guptill, 2001) 
 Nell Brinkley and the New Woman in the Early 20th Century (McFarland & Co., 2001) 
 Eternally Bad: Goddesses with Attitude (Conari Press, 2001) 
 Tender Murderers: Women Who Kill (Conari Press, 2003) 
 Wild Irish Roses: Tales of Brigits, Kathleens, and Warrior Queens (Conari Press, 2004) 
  "Girls on Top?", chapter 6 of Dez Skinn's Comix: The Underground Revolution (Collins & Brown/Thunder's Mouth, 2004) 
 The Brinkley Girls: The Best of Nell Brinkley's Cartoons from 1913–1940 (Fantagraphics Books, 2009) —introduction
 Forbidden City: The Golden Age of Chinese Nightclubs (Hampton Press, 2009) 
 Lily Renée, Escape Artist: From Holocaust Survivor to Comic Book Pioneer (Graphic Universe, 2011) 
 Pretty In Ink: North American Women Cartoonists 1896–2013 (Fantagraphics Books, 2013) 
 Babes in Arms: Women in Comics During the Second World War (Hermes Press, 2017) 
 Flapper Queens: Women Cartoonists of the Jazz Age (Fantagraphics Books, 2020)

References

Sources

External links

Trina Robbins Collection guide at the Billy Ireland Cartoon Library & Museum

1938 births
21st-century American Jews
21st-century American women
American female comics artists
American feminists
American illustrators
American women illustrators
Artists from the San Francisco Bay Area
Comics critics
Female comics writers
Feminist artists
Feminist criticism
Jewish American artists
Living people
Underground cartoonists
Inkpot Award winners